Sodium cyanoborohydride is the chemical compound with the formula NaBH3CN. It is a colourless salt, but commercial samples can appear tan. It is widely used in organic synthesis for the reduction of imines. The salt tolerates aqueous conditions.

Use
Owing to the presence of the electron-withdrawing cyanide substituent, [B(CN)H3]− is less reducing than is [BH4]−. As a mild reducing agent, it is used to convert imines to amines.

It is especially favored for reductive aminations, wherein aldehydes or ketones are treated with an amine in the presence of this reagent:
  R2CO + R'NH2 + NaBH3CN + CH3OH → R2CH-NHR' + "NaCH3OBH2CN"
The reagent is typically used in excess. Selectivity is achieved at mildly basic solutions (pH 7–10). The reagent is ideal for reductive aminations ("Borch Reaction"). In conjunction with tosylhydrazine, sodium cyanoborohydride is used in the reductive deoxygenation of ketones.

Structure and preparation
The tetrahedral BH3(CN)− comprises the anionic component of the salt.

The reagent is often purchased, although it can be prepared easily. One method involves combining sodium cyanide and borane. Another route entails treating sodium borohydride with mercury(II) cyanide. The commercial samples can be purified, but the yields of the reductive aminations do not improve.

See also
 Sodium triacetoxyborohydride – a milder reductant, but unstable in water
 Sodium borohydride – a stronger, cheaper reductant

References

Borohydrides
Sodium compounds
Reducing agents